Howz-e Sheykh-e Zemkan (also Romanized as Ḩowẕ-e Sheykh-e Zemkān; also known as Ḩowẕ-e Sheykh) is a village in Zamkan Rural District, in the Central District of Salas-e Babajani County, Kermanshah Province, Iran. At the 2006 census, its population was 100, in 18 families.

References 

Populated places in Salas-e Babajani County